Bottlebrush is a common name used to refer to several genera of plants.  These include:

Callistemon, a genus of shrubs and trees from Australia
Beaufortia, a genus of shrubs from Australia
Elymus hystrix, a species of bunchgrass from North America
Elymus californicus, a species of bunch grass from North America known as California bottlebrush grass